Del Rio or del Río is a Spanish term meaning "of / from the river", and may refer to:

Places in the United States
 Del Rio, California
 Del Rio, Florida
 Del Rio, Tennessee
 Del Rio, Texas

People
 Alberto Del Rio (born 1977; real name Alberto Rodríguez), Mexican professional wrestler who also performed under the name Dos Caras, Jr.
 Andrés Manuel del Río (1764–1849), scientist and naturalist who discovered the chemical element vanadium
 Bianca Del Rio (born 1975), American drag queen
 Carlos Alberto Arroyo del Río, Ecuadorean politician
 Dolores del Río (1904–1983), Mexican actress
 Gabriel del Río (born 1976), Argentine-born Spanish chess grandmaster
 Harry Del Rios (born 1973), American pro-wrestler
 Jack Del Rio (born 1963), American football player and coach
 Luke Del Rio (born 1994), American football player and coach, son of Jack
 Paloma del Río (born 1960), Spanish journalist
 Paul del Rio (1943-2015), Venezuelan kidnapper, sculptor and painter
 Rebekah Del Rio, Mexican-American singer/songwriter   
 Yolanda del Rio (born 1955), Mexican singer

See also
 Los del Río, Latin pop band

 Ford Del Rio, an American station wagon  

 Rio (disambiguation)